Bohaskaia is an extinct genus of beluga-like odontocete cetacean known from the Early Pliocene of Virginia and North Carolina, United States. It was first named by Jorge Vélez-Juarbe and Nicholas D. Pyenson in 2012 and the type species is Bohaskaia monodontoides.

References 

 

Prehistoric cetacean genera
Monodontidae
Fossil taxa described in 2012
Pliocene cetaceans
Fossils of the United States